Dhanmondi Cricket Stadium is a stadium in Dhaka, Bangladesh that hosts domestic and inter-collegiate cricket matches. It is the home of the Dhaka division cricket team.

Dhanmondi
Cricket grounds in Bangladesh
Sports venues in Dhaka
Cricket in Dhaka